Se Fonto Kokkino is the second longest running daily Cypriot soap opera. The show consists of 735 episodes in four seasons and it was produced and broadcast by Sigma TV, created by Demetres Tokaris and directed by Nick G Kokkinos, Loizos Markides, Kiros Rossidis and Giorgos Siougas.

Main cast

Main cast includes:

Giannis Voglis

Stavros Louras (episodes: 1 - 735)

Andreas Tsouris (episodes: 1 - 735)

Panagiotis Bougiouris

Sofoklis Kaskaounias

Nicholas Kouroumzis

Maria Fiaka

Fani Sokratous (episodes: 1 - 735)

Andreas Georgiou

Niovi Spyridaki

Elena Liasidou

Katia Nikolaidou

Stratos Tzortzoglou

Natalia Dragoumi
                          
                           Christina Terezopoulou
Danae Christou

Giannis Tsimitselis
Monika Meleki

References

Cypriot television soap operas
Sigma TV original programming